Étienne La Font de Saint-Yenne (born 1688 in Lyon, died 1771 in Paris) was a French art critic of the eighteenth century.

References

French art critics
1688 births
1771 deaths
French male non-fiction writers